Brodie railway station served the area of Brodie, Moray, Scotland from 1857 to 1965 on the Inverness and Aberdeen Junction Railway.

History 
The station opened in 1857 by the Inverness and Aberdeen Junction Railway. The station closed to both passengers and goods traffic in 1965

References

External links 

Disused railway stations in Moray
Railway stations in Great Britain opened in 1857
Railway stations in Great Britain closed in 1965
Beeching closures in Scotland
Former Highland Railway stations
1857 establishments in Scotland